The Stebbins and Roberts Office Building and Factory is a historic manufacturing facility at 1300 East 6th Street in Little Rock, Arkansas. It has a buff brick exterior, and its main entrance has Art Deco decorative elements. The plant was built in 1947 to a design by Burks and Anderson, a prominent local architectural firm. It is their only known surviving industrial design.

The property was listed on the National Register of Historic Places in 2016.

See also

National Register of Historic Places listings in Little Rock, Arkansas

References

Industrial buildings and structures on the National Register of Historic Places in Arkansas
Buildings and structures completed in 1947
Buildings and structures in Little Rock, Arkansas
National Register of Historic Places in Little Rock, Arkansas